The 2015–16 season was the 119th season of competitive football in Scotland. The domestic season began on 25 July 2015, with the first round of the 2015–16 Scottish Challenge Cup. The 2015–16 Scottish Professional Football League season commenced on 1 August.

Transfer deals

League competitions

Scottish Premiership

Scottish Championship

Scottish League One

Scottish League Two

Non-league football

Level 5

Level 6

SPFL Development League

Honours

Cup honours

Non-league honours

Senior

Junior
West Region

East Region

North Region

Individual honours

PFA Scotland awards

SFWA awards

Scottish clubs in Europe

Celtic, Inverness Caledonian Thistle, Aberdeen and St Johnstone qualified for European competition.

Celtic
UEFA Champions League

UEFA Europa League

Aberdeen
UEFA Europa League

Inverness Caledonian Thistle
UEFA Europa League

St Johnstone
UEFA Europa League

Scotland national team

Women's football

Scottish Women's Premier League

League and Cup honours

Individual honours

SWPL awards

UEFA Women's Champions League

Glasgow City

Scotland women's national team

Deaths
10 July: Jimmy Murray, 82, Hearts, Falkirk, Clyde, Raith Rovers and Scotland forward.
2 August: Sammy Cox, 91, Queen's Park, Third Lanark, Dundee, Rangers, East Fife and Scotland defender.
6 August: Danny Hegan, 72, Albion Rovers midfielder.
16 August: George Merchant, 89, Dundee and Falkirk forward.
29 August: Graham Leggat, 81, Aberdeen and Scotland forward.
6 September: Ralph Milne, 54, Dundee United winger.
6 September: Hugh Ormond, 92, Dundee United and St Mirren full back.
12 September: Jim Doherty, 61, Albion Rovers and Stranraer midfielder.
1 October: Joe Wark, 67, Motherwell defender.
2 October: Johnny Paton, 92, Celtic winger.
17 October: Johnny Hamilton, 66, Rangers, Hibernian and St Johnstone midfielder.
23 October: Peter Price, 83, St Mirren, Ayr United, Raith Rovers and Albion Rovers forward.
25 October: Matt Watson, 79, Kilmarnock and Queen of the South full-back.
5 November: Brown McMaster, 66, Scottish Football League president (2007–09); Partick Thistle and Stenhousemuir executive.
15 November: Jackie McGugan, 76, St Mirren, Ayr United and Morton defender.
5 December: Willie Coburn, 74, St Johnstone, Forfar and Cowdenbeath defender.
6 December: Ian Burns, 76, Aberdeen and Brechin City wing half.
8 December: Alan Hodgkinson, 79, Scotland goalkeeping coach.
10 December: Arnold Peralta, 26, Rangers midfielder.
December: Duncan Lambie, 63, Dundee, St Johnstone and Hibernian forward.
19 January: Joachim Fernandez, 43, Dundee United defender.
22 January: Tommy Bryceland, 76, St Mirren forward and manager.
January: John Dowie, 60, Celtic and Clyde defender
28 January: Dave Thomson, 77, Dunfermline Athletic, Queen of the South, Berwick Rangers and East Stirlingshire forward.
28 January: Tommy O'Hara, 62, Queen of the South, Motherwell, Falkirk and Partick Thistle midfielder.
4 February: Harry Glasgow, 76, Clyde, Arbroath and Stenhousemuir defender, Stenhousemuir manager.
24 February: Jim McFadzean, 77, Heart of Midlothian, St Mirren, Raith Rovers, Kilmarnock and Ayr United defender.
4 March: Eddie Blyth, 91, St Mirren forward.
11 March: Billy Ritchie, 79, Rangers, Partick Thistle, Motherwell, Stranraer and Scotland goalkeeper.
22 March: Les Thomson, 79, Falkirk, Stirling Albion and Stenhousemuir centre-half.
31 March: Ian Britton, 61, Dundee United and Arbroath midfielder.
31 March: Jimmy Toner, 91, Dundee inside forward.
7 May: Chris Mitchell, 27, Falkirk, Ayr United, Bradford City, Queen of the South and Clyde midfielder.
8 May: George Ross, 73, Preston North End full back.
11 May: Bobby Carroll, 77, Celtic, St Mirren, Dundee United and Queen of the South winger.
14 May: Jim Finlayson, East Fife, Forfar Athletic and Montrose forward.
14 May: John Coyle, 83, Dundee United, Brechin City and Clyde forward.
25 May: Ian Gibson, 73, Scotland under-23 international.
20 June: Willie Logie, 83, Rangers, Aberdeen, Arbroath, Brechin City and Alloa Athletic wing half.

Notes and references

 
Seasons in Scottish football